Oon Shu An (born 5 August 1986) is a Singaporean actress and host. She is the web-show host of Clicknetwork.tv's Tried and Tested.

Early life 
Oon was educated at Methodist Girls' School. She graduated from the LASALLE College of the Arts, majoring in acting.

Filmography 
Oon has appeared in numerous Singaporean feature films, short films and television shows. She is also the host of Tried and Tested on Clicknetwork.tv.

Film

Television

Theatre
Oon's one-woman show, #UnicornMoment, which she wrote and performed, with Checkpoint Theatre, was picked a highlight of 2014's local theatre offerings by The Straits Times, and nominated for best original script at the Life! Theatre Awards in 2015. Oon has been nominated twice for the best actress award at the Life! Theatre Awards, Singapore's de facto national theatre awards in 2019 for her lead role in Mergers and Accusations, and in 2016 for the role of Xi Yan in the play Chinglish at the Life! Theatre Awards.

References

External links
 Tried and Tested on clicknetwork.tv

Living people
Singaporean people of Chinese descent
Singaporean television personalities
Singaporean television actresses
Singaporean actresses
Singaporean stage actresses
21st-century Singaporean actresses
1986 births